The Dowling House, at 321 S. Main St. in Lawrenceburg, Kentucky, was built in 1886.  It was listed on the National Register of Historic Places in 1979.

It is a two-and-a-half-story west-facing brick house, with a three-story central pavilion.  It was modified in 1915 and after 1930 and has elements of Italianate and Queen Anne architecture.

The listing included a second contributing building, a carriage house.

References

National Register of Historic Places in Anderson County, Kentucky
Italianate architecture in Kentucky
Queen Anne architecture in Kentucky
Houses completed in 1886
1886 establishments in Kentucky